The Society of Stock Exchange Management (in ; SGBV) is the only stock exchange of Algeria. It is in operation since 1997. Despite a 62% increase over one year SGBV remains one of the smallest stock exchanges in the world since 2011.

History

The first attempt 
The idea of creating a stock exchange in Algiers appeared in 1990 as part of the economic reforms of 1988 . It is established by law  :
 88-01 on the orientation of EPA (Economic Public Enterprises);
 88-03 with formation of 8 funds for participation;
 88-04 amending and supplementing the Ordinance 59-75 of 26/09/1975 on the Code of Commerce.
These laws introduced the distinction between state ownership and state public authorities.
In 1990 the company was incorporated securities (SVM), its capital is held by the fund 8 to participate. Its capital in 1992 rose to 9.32 million  DA in the same year its name was changed as well and became "Securities Exchange (BVM)." In the absence of specific laws and code of commerce suitable for the market economy has been able to exercise the stock market.

Laws related to the stock exchange 
 Decree law 93-08 of 25  April  1993 amending and supplementing Ordinance 75-59 of 26  September  1975 concerning the Commercial Code:
 Introduction of the possibility of formation of joint-stock company with a public call for the savings,
 Definition of securities as joint stock companies listed, or may be, may issue;
 Ordinance 96-27 of 9  December  1996 amending and supplementing Ordinance 75-59 of 26 September 1975 on the Commercial Code: This order defined the rules of operation of various commercial companies;
 Decree Law 93-10 of 23  May  1993 to:
 established the stock exchange,
 defined as the stock market: the context of organization and conduct of operations on securities issued by the State, other legal persons of public law as well as corporations,
 agencies set up the stock exchange:
 Organising Committee and a Monitoring and Exchange constitutes the authority of the securities market,
 a management company of the Stock Exchange: the market operator,
 a Central Securities Depository Clearing Denommé Algeria, joint stock company with capital of DZD 240 million held by banks and listed companies. Clearing Algeria was born in 2001 and began operations in 2004 (www.algerieclearing.dz)
 intermediaries and Exchange: investment firms;
 Law 95-22 of 26  August  1995 on the privatization of public enterprises as amended and supplemented by Ordinance 97-12 of 19  March  1997 brought the action mechanisms of the stock exchange as a form of privatization;
 Law 95-25 of 25  September  1995 on the management of merchant capital of the state has set specific rules for the organization, management and control of public funds held by the State in the form of securities representing the capital ;
 May 23, 1993, Creation of the regulator is the market COSOB (Organising Committee and Securities and Exchange Surveillance).

Actual start of the Algiers Stock Exchange 
 May 25, 1997, with the formation of SGBV shareholders six public banks (BDL, BEA, BADR, CPA, BNA and CNEP)
 13 September 1999, the first listing on the stock exchange of Algiers with state-owned food ERIAD Setif, which opens 20% of its capital.
 20 September 1999, the pharmaceutical public SAIDAL is next in turn to the exchange of Algiers.
 14 February 2000, the HGE Aurassi, manager of the hotel public Aurassi also between the Algiers Stock Exchange.
 7 March 2011, Alliance Insurance, ten years after the last introduction, become the first private company to Algerian its IPO, the title will be next in February 2011.

Taxation 

The Finance Act of 2009 exempts from tax the proceeds of securities and shares of total income tax for a period of five years
The Finance Act 2004 provides for exemption from IRB (tax on income and profits) and IBS (tax on company profits) on income from securities listed or traded on an organized market for a period of five years with effect from 1 January 2009.
The level of transaction in the stock market remains relatively low, it does not cover the costs of the institution market.

External links 
 Official Site of the Algiers Stock Exchange
 http://www.algerieclearing.dz
 COSOB

Notes and references 

Stock exchanges in Africa
Economy of Algiers